The Key Underwood Coon Dog Memorial Graveyard is a specialized and restricted pet cemetery and memorial in rural Colbert County, Alabama, US. It is reserved specifically for the burials of coon dogs. The cemetery was established by Key Underwood on September 4, 1937. Underwood buried his own dog there, choosing the spot, previously a popular hunting camp where "Troop" did 15 years of service. , more than 300 dogs were buried in the graveyard.

Criteria for burial are fairly well established, albeit being subject to interpretation and application. Only bona fide "coonhounds" are to be buried there. The exact measure of that standard depends on breeding, experience and performance; and seemingly depends on who and when the tale is told and the determination made.

History

Key Underwood established the cemetery on September 4, 1937, interring his coon dog, Troop, in an old hunting camp located in rural Colbert County, Alabama, US. The closest town is Cherokee, Alabama. At the time, Underwood only intended to bury Troop in a place they had coon hunted together for 15 years. The memorial was a serendipitous afterthought. Underwood buried Troop there, three feet deep, with an engraved old chimney stone for a marker. Later, other bereaved hunters followed his example when their dogs died, and the cemetery flourished as a result.
 The entrance is marked by a statue of two coonhounds treeing a raccoon. During a 1984 interview with columnist Rheta Grimsley Johnson, Underwood said that burying Troop was doing "something special for a special coon dog". Allowance of mere pets is contraindicated. "It would reveal that you must not know much about coon hunters and their dogs, if you think we would contaminate this burial place with poodles and lap dogs."

Dogs must meet three requirements to qualify for burial at the cemetery: 
the owner must verify that their dog was a purebred coonhound
a witness must declare that the dead animal is a coon dog
a member of the local coonhunters' organization must be allowed to view the remains. The cemetery is not actually "breed specific" but at a minimum requires that the dog was actually used to hunt coons, and not something else. Admission criteria are game specific. Quoting O'Neal Bolton, former caretaker of the Coon Dog Graveyard, the cemetery's website notes:"We have stipulations on this thing, ... A dog can't run no deer, possum  nothing like that. He's got to be a straight coon dog, and he's got to be full hound. Couldn't be a mixed up breed dog, a house dog."

To be sure, being a full blooded coonhound from a recognized breed  i.e., "Redbone, black and tan, English bluetick, English redtick, Plott, Treeing Walker, and various combinations of the above"  is a plus. But "many non-AKC breeds of Southern hunting hounds (such as our native frontier hounds, the Black Mouth Curs, Plott Hounds, Catahoulas, and Mountain Curs)" may be admitted, but then must be proven to meet all three of the criteria, and have no fewer than three witnesses who will attest that they have seen the dog track and tree coons single-handedly.

Headstones and markers in the cemetery range from homemade metal and wooden monuments to more intricate marble engraved stones, akin to human gravesites. They range from humble and home made to relatively well-crafted and ostentatious. Each reveals a touching story and makes a tribute. Some have epitaphs, such as "He wasn't the best, but he was the best I ever owned". The interred dogs include many notable hunting dogs such as Hunter's Famous Amos, Ralston Purina's 1984 Dog of the Year. It is the only cemetery in the world specifically dedicated to coonhounds. By 2014, over 300 dogs were buried in the cemetery.

More generally, There are two monumental sculptures. It is a tourist attraction, albeit well off the beaten path. Maintained by the Tennessee Valley Coon Hunters Association, it receives nearly 7,000 visitors annually. Visitors are encouraged to sign in to the guest book on premises.

The entrance is festooned with warning signs, some pocked with many bullet holes, which advise visitors of surveillance by the neighborhood; another forbids lighting fires, and stresses only coon dogs buried with permission are allowed.

"Remembrances of dogs past happen a lot at the cemetery. Tears are shed, for they're more than dogs. They're more than pets. They're friends. More – they are family members. Funerals befitting a family's grand matriarch  up on the hill a handful of times a year because some of the dogs there are grand matriarchs. Families bury their own, like Key Underwood did that sad Labor Day." The seriousness and solemnity of being interred at the memorial is illustrated here:
"A group of solemn men, dressed in black mourning coats and hip boots, wearing carbide lamps on their heads stood beside a mound of soil and a freshly dug hole. A hunting horn sounded and the bay of hounds filled the air." Four outiftted pallbearers "... walked slowly toward the gathered crowd, a small wooden box carried between them".

"The last lines of William's eulogy memorialize the relationship between hunter and dog:

"'...he knows in coon dog heaven he can hunt again when the sun goes down and the tree frogs holler. May the bones of Ole Red rest in peace, through the mercy of God and may the coon hunters light perpetually shine upon him.'"

Caretaker and contact person for the cemetery was Janice M. Williams, aka the "Coon Dog Lady", who is the cemetery board's president. She was the first reported person to actually "count the graves scattered across that pastoral acre: 307 as of January 2014. She keeps it presentable (without care the forest quickly encroaches)."

As the 75th anniversary of the cemetery approached, coins and replica service medals started to be left on the graves.

The cemetery evolved, as has the sport of coon hunting. "These days hunting's about competition... Used to, people hunted [raccoons] for their hides or in the Depression, they ate them, but we don't shoot [raccoons] anymore." Dogs are supposed to be independent, capable of hunting on their own, and "honest, meaning it won't run deer or rabbits; and it'll stay put, meaning it'll stay no matter rain, a storm, or another dog aggravating it," says Lee Hatton, grounds caretaker. A United Kennel Club title requires beating other champions and "It takes 100 hard-earned points to become a champion."

The facility is officially recognized as an historic cemetery by the State of Alabama.

The memorial's thematic purpose has been summarized:
"Twelve years is a long time to be loved like that, and it’s a good life for a dog. It’s a good life for anybody. This is the only graveyard I’ve been to that was less an acknowledgment of death than it is a celebration of what almost certainly was, grave for coon dog grave, a damn good life."

Labor Day
Every Labor Day the Tennessee Valley Coon Hunter's Association sponsors a gathering at the cemetery in a tribute to the inauguration of the cemetery on Labor Day in 1937. The celebration includes bluegrass music, dancing, barbecue and a liar's contest. Admission is free to the public, but donations are accepted and help defray upkeep expenses. In 2014 eight Redbone Coonhound puppies were sold at the gathering, with proceeds going to upkeep. The gathering is often attended by local politicians.

Popular culture
The cemetery was featured in the movie Sweet Home Alabama, but the producers used artistic license to relocate it to south Alabama. The film's protagonists go looking for the graves of dogs named "Bear" and "Bryant", an homage to Bear Bryant the football coach.

The cemetery and the Labor Day gathering are remembered in song by Milan Miller.

In 1987, an authorized 50th anniversary Case knife souvenir was sold to honor the dogs and the cemetery. With new graphics and subject matter, the promotion was repeated to honor 75th anniversary in 2012.

See also
Armstrong, William H. Sounder novel (1969) and film (1972)
Gates of Heaven documentary film about the Pet cemetery business
Hunting with hounds
Rainbow Bridge (pets)
Rawls, Wilson. Where the Red Fern Grows, children's novel and two film adaptations 1974 and 2003.
The Hunt (The Twilight Zone)
Variant Creutzfeldt–Jakob disease (Kuru) from eating squirrel brains.

References

Bibliography

Further reading
 and related books.

 Children's book.

External links
Coon Dog Cemetery Photo Gallery

Key Underwood Coon Dog Memorial Graveyard Cemetery on Facebook

Ramsey, William W.; Ramsey, Braley W. (Introduction) (2005) The Coon Dog Eulogy

Afterlife places
Animals and humans
Animal cemeteries
Animals in religion
Cemeteries in Alabama
Dogs in religion
Dog monuments
Florence–Muscle Shoals metropolitan area
Hunting by game
Hunting in the United States
Hunting with hounds
Protected areas of Colbert County, Alabama
Tourist attractions in Colbert County, Alabama
Procyonidae
Cemeteries established in the 1930s